Cordillera is a province in the Santa Cruz Department, Bolivia. Its capital is Lagunillas.

Geography 
This area of the Santa Cruz Chaco occupies the southern part of the department, is the largest province of the country, geographically defined as the Gran Chaco and that extends to the departments of Tarija and Chuquisaca and even the republics of Paraguay and Argentina. Characteristics of dry weather, warm day and cold at night. The name of this province is due to its topography, being the largest province in the department and the country. Bounded on the north by the provinces of Chiquitos and Andrés Ibáñez. The south by the Republic of Paraguay and the department of Chuquisaca. The east by the Germán Busch province. To the West and the department of Chuquisaca province Vallegrande Florida and has a surface area of 86,245 km2 occupying 23.3% of the total area of the department, being the largest province of the country Its height above sea level is: 1240 m has a population: 190,768,098 inhabitants (2001 census). A population density: 1.49 people per km2 Relief .- belongs to a clearly defined geographical area known as Gran Chaco, which extends to the departments of Chuquisaca and Tarija and the republics of Argentina and Paraguay. One of the three quarters of the territory is on the ramifications of (Cordillera Real or Oriental) This region is made up of parallel chains oriented from north to south decrease gradually increased until complete series of low hills. The remaining two thirds are just plain wet and covered with vegetation.

Subdivision 
The province is divided into seven municipalities which are further subdivided into cantons.

History 
La Cordillera de los Chiriguanosa or simply Cordillera is the word with which the colonial era began to know what is now the Cordillera Province and large surrounding territories. This name is because Chiriguanosa - Guarani occupied much of the Andean Cordillera orbit. The Royal Charter of 17 December 1743 established that the territory of the Cordillera Province came from the south to the banks of the Pilcomayo River, and the east to the Paraguay River. By a decree of January 23, 1826 issued under the presidency of Marshal Antonio José de Sucre, Cordillera Province was established with five departments of Bolivia. The DS 24 September 1857 that is subject to Cordillera the political leadership of Santa Cruz, with total independence from Vallegrande. Only three months later, on December 25 DS 1857 leads to the creation of the political leadership of the Cordillera, which was not implemented. Act of 1863 are created in the prefectures and sub-departments and provinces, respectively, to replace the political leadership created by Supreme Decree on December 25, 1857. The sub would be the responsibility of raising the contribution indigenal. In 1877 The Board of Directors of the Cordillera province leads the Supreme Government a comprehensive note, accompanied by incontrovertible documents on the right of that province and the territories of Cuevo Ibo, sought by the department of Chuquisaca.

Places of interest 
 Kaa-Iya del Gran Chaco National Park and Integrated Management Natural Area
 Otuquis National Park and Integrated Management Natural Area

Provinces of Santa Cruz Department (Bolivia)
Gran Chaco
